Ľubomír Roman (12 April 1944 – 13 March 2022) was a Slovak politician. A member of the Christian Democratic Movement, he served as Minister of Culture from March to December 1994 and was a member of the National Council from 1994 to 1998. He died of a heart attack in Bratislava on 13 March 2022, at the age of 77.

References

1944 births
2022 deaths
Slovak male actors
Slovak stage actors
Slovak film actors
Slovak television actors
Members of the National Council (Slovakia) 1994-1998
Christian Democratic Movement politicians
Culture ministers of Slovakia
People from Malacky
Academy of Performing Arts in Bratislava alumni